Chrysoroyiatissa (Greek: Χρυσορρογιάτισσα) is a monastery dedicated to Our Lady of the Golden Pomegranate located about 40 kilometers north-east of Paphos, Cyprus at an altitude of around 820 meters. It was founded by a monk called Ignatius (Greek: Ιγνάτιος) in the 12th century. It lies 1.5 kilometers from the village of Panayia, birthplace of the late Archbishop Makarios. The present building dates to 1770. 

Celebrations are held yearly on 15 August in honour of the Virgin Mary. In the mid 1980s the old winery of the monastery was reopened and now runs on a commercial basis. It produces wines from the monastery's own vineyards.

External links
Paphos Bishopric, with links to the monastery 

Cypriot Orthodox monasteries
Christian monasteries established in the 12th century
Greek Orthodox monasteries